Hilaire Onwanlélé-Ozimo (born 14 October 1968) is a Gabonese athlete. He competed in the men's high jump at the 1992 Summer Olympics.

References

External links
 

1968 births
Living people
Athletes (track and field) at the 1992 Summer Olympics
Gabonese male high jumpers
Olympic athletes of Gabon
Place of birth missing (living people)
21st-century Gabonese people